Patricia Haines (3 February 1932 – 25 February 1977) was an English actress, best known for her television work. She was married to Michael Caine from 1954 to 1958.

Career 
Haines was born in Sheffield, West Riding of  Yorkshire. She is best known for her television work. Her credits include: Dixon of Dock Green, Steptoe and Son, The Avengers (in which she appeared in four episodes: Girl on the Trapeze [uncredited], The Nutshell, The Master Minds, and Who's Who ???), Danger Man, Public Eye, The Baron, Softly, Softly, Adam Adamant Lives!, The Champions, The Saint, Department S, Randall and Hopkirk (Deceased), Up Pompeii! (as "Pussius Galoria" in an episode entitled Jamus Bondus), Emmerdale Farm, Special Branch, The Protectors, and Within These Walls. Her film roles include: The Shakedown (1959 film), The Last Shot You Hear, (1969), Walk a Crooked Path (1969), The Fast Kill (1972), The Night Caller, (1965), and Virgin Witch (1972), directed by Ray Austin.

Personal life
She met actor Michael Caine in repertory theatre in Lowestoft, Suffolk at the Arcadia Theatre (now the East Coast Cinema in London Road South) with Jackson Stanley's 'Standard Players'. They married on 3 April 1954 at Lothingland Register Office before moving on to London. They had a daughter, Dominique (born 14 August 1957), before divorcing in 1958. Haines married actor Bernard Kay in October 1963.

Haines died of lung cancer, on 25 February 1977, aged 45; she was cremated on 1 March.

Theatre 
 Week commencing 22 May 1953 as Lottie Clegg in Bed, Board & Romance
 W/c 5 October 1953 as Mrs Titterton in Artificial Silk
 W/c 23 November 1953 as Mrs Gulch in Jonty Dewhurst's The House on the Moor
 W/c 30 November 1953 as Lydia Waring in a drama entitled The Loving Elms
 W/c 7 December 1953 as Matron in This Is My Life
 W/c 14 December 1953 as Lola Salvani in Piccadilly Alibi by Guy Paxton & Edward V. Hoille
 W/c 21 December 1953 as Olivier Meldon in the Christmas play But Once a Year
 W/c 28 December 1953 as Bubbles Merton in Dennis Staveley's Charley's Uncle
 W/c 4 January 1954 as Diana Wayne in a thriller called Peril on the Pier
 W/c 18 January 1954 as Joanna Cooper in the Wilfred Massey play The Feminine Touch
 W/c 1 February 1954 as Dr Harrington in John Essex's play The 10.5 Never Stops
 W/c 22 February 1954 as Fenella in Joan Morgan's This Was a Woman

Filmography 
 The Shakedown (1960) – Modelling Student (uncredited)
 Clue of the Silver Key (1961) – Policewoman
 The Night Caller (1965) – Ann Barlow
 The Last Shot You Hear (1969) – Anne Nordeck
 Walk a Crooked Path (1969) – Nancy Coleman
 Virgin Witch (1971) – Sybil Waite
 The Fast Kill (1972) – Victoria Leach

References

External links 
 

1931 births
1977 deaths
20th-century English actresses
Deaths from lung cancer in England
English film actresses
English television actresses
Actresses from Sheffield